Poolman is a surname. Notable people with the surname include:

Danie Poolman (born 1989), South African rugby union player
Jeremy Poolman, British writer
Prof.dr. Rudolf W. Poolman (born 1970), Dutch Orthopedic Surgeon and Scientist 
Jim Poolman (born 1970), American banker and politician
Tucker Poolman (born 1993), American professional ice hockey defenseman

See also 
 Poolman (film), an upcoming film starring Chris Pine